Tamara Golovey is a Chess Master, Chess International Arbiter and the Merited Coach of the Republic of Belarus. Her United States Chess Federation rating (USCF) is 2322.

Biography 
Tamara was born in Uchqoʻrgʻon, Uzbek Soviet Socialist Republic, on September 19, 1943. 
She started studying chess at 12 under A. Shagalovich (Minsk). Although she graduated from Belarusian Polytechnic Institute in 1965, she left the engineering career for chess. Since 1970 she has been the Chief Chess Coach of Minsk Children's Sports School of Olympic Reserve N 11.

She won Belarusian Women Chess Championship three times (1965, 1969 and 1976) and was a multiple finalist of the USSR Women's Chess Championships. From 1989 she became an International Arbiter. She was Chief Arbiter of many international tournaments.

Since 1999 Tamara has lived in the USA. She took third place together with Albert Chow (FIDE Master, USCF 2294) in 2000 Illinois Open Chess Championship and fourth in 2001 Illinois Open among men. She successfully continues to prepare children in Chicago for tournament play.

Coach 
"As a leading chess coach in the former Soviet Union, Tamara Golovey trained some of the top-ranked players in the world", such as Boris Gelfand, International Grandmaster, double Olympic Champion, ranked third in the world in 1991 and winner of the Candidates Tournament in 2011, and Yury Shulman, International Grandmaster, 2008 US Champion.

Her students have included:
 Yuliya Levitan, International Master, 1992 US Olympic team member (USCF 2228)
 Valeri Atlas, International Master, 1994 Olympic bronze medalist (USCF 2448)
 Eric Rosen, International Master (USCF 2413)

References

External links 
 
 

Chess coaches
Living people
1943 births
People from Namangan Region
Belarusian emigrants to the United States
Soviet female chess players
Belarusian female chess players
Uzbekistani Jews
Belarusian Jews
Soviet Jews
Jewish chess players
Chess players from Minsk
Chess arbiters